Palicourea subalatoides is a species of plant in the family Rubiaceae. It is endemic to Ecuador.

References

Flora of Ecuador
subalatoides
Near threatened plants
Taxonomy articles created by Polbot